The CBS Evening News is the flagship evening television news program of CBS News, the news division of the CBS television network in the United States. The CBS Evening News is a daily evening broadcast featuring news reports, feature stories and interviews by CBS News correspondents and reporters covering events around the world. The program has been broadcast since July 1, 1941, under the original title CBS Television News, eventually adopting its current title in 1963.

Since July 15, 2019, the nightly broadcast has been anchored by Norah O'Donnell and has been titled CBS Evening News with Norah O’Donnell; since December 2, 2019, the newscast has emanated from CBS News’ bureau in Washington, D.C. Previous weeknight anchors have included Douglas Edwards, Walter Cronkite, Dan Rather, Connie Chung, Bob Schieffer, Katie Couric, Scott Pelley, and Jeff Glor.

Saturday and Sunday broadcasts of the CBS Evening News began in February 1966. On May 2, 2016, CBS announced that the weekend edition would be rebranded, effective May 7, 2016, as the CBS Weekend News. Weekend newscasts emanate from the CBS Broadcast Center in New York City and were anchored by Reena Ninan on Saturday and Elaine Quijano on Sunday. By the summer of 2020 Ninan and Quijano were replaced by Major Garrett and Jamie Yuccas. In December 2020, it was announced that Adriana Diaz and Jericka Duncan would be the new weekend anchors.

The weeknight edition of the CBS Evening News airs live at 6:30 p.m. in the Eastern and 5:30 p.m. in the Central Time Zones and is tape delayed for the Mountain Time Zone. A "Western Edition", with updated segments covering breaking news stories, airs pre-recorded at 6:30 p.m. in the Pacific Time Zone and on tape delay in the Alaska and Hawaii–Aleutian Time Zones.

As of March 4, 2019, CBS Evening News remains in third place of the three major television news programs, with 6,309,000 total viewers.

History

Early years (1941–1948)
Upon becoming commercial station WCBW (channel 2, now WCBS-TV) on July 1, 1941, the pioneer CBS television station in New York City broadcast two daily news programs, at 2:30 p.m. and 8:00 p.m. weekdays, anchored by Richard Hubbell. Most of the newscasts featured Hubbell reading a script with only occasional cutaways to a map or still photograph. When Pearl Harbor was bombed on December 7, 1941, WCBW (which was usually off the air on Sunday to give the engineers a day off), took to the air at 8:45 p.m. with an extensive special report. The national emergency broke down the unspoken wall between CBS radio and television. WCBW executives convinced radio announcers and experts such as George Fielding Elliot and Linton Wells to come to the CBS television studios at Grand Central Station from the radio network's base at 485 Madison Avenue, to give information and commentary on the attack. The WCBW special report that night lasted less than 90 minutes, but it pushed the limits of live television in 1941 and opened up new possibilities for future broadcasts. As CBS wrote in a special report to the FCC, the unscheduled live news broadcast on December 7 "was unquestionably the most stimulating challenge and marked the greatest advance of any single problem faced up to that time."

Additional newscasts were scheduled in the early days of the war, including War Backgrounds (December 1941–February 1942), World This Week (February–April 1942), and America At War (March–May 1942). In May 1942, WCBW (like almost all television stations) temporarily suspended studio operations, which resulted in the station sharply cutting back its live program schedule, and resorting exclusively to the occasional broadcast of films. This was primarily because much of the staff had either joined the military service or were redeployed to war-related technical research, and to prolong the life of the early, unstable cameras which were now impossible to repair due to the wartime lack of parts.

In May 1944, as the war began to turn in favor of the Allies, WCBW reopened the studios and the newscasts returned, briefly anchored by Ned Calmer, followed by Alan Jackson, Everett Holles, and Dwight Cooke. After the war, expanded news programs appeared on the WCBW schedule. The station's call letters were changed to WCBS-TV in 1946. Anchors included Bob McKee, Milo Boulton, Jim McMullin, Larry LeSueur, Tom O’Connor, and, beginning in 1947, Douglas Edwards.

Douglas Edwards (1948–1962)

On May 3, 1948, Edwards began anchoring CBS Television News, now a regular 15-minute nightly newscast on the CBS television network, including WCBS-TV. It aired every weeknight at 7:30 p.m., and was the first regularly scheduled, network television news program featuring an anchor. (WCBW/WCBS-TV newscasts prior to this time were local television broadcasts seen only in New York City.) NBC's offering at the time, NBC Television Newsreel, which premiered in February 1948, was simply film footage with voice narration.

The network also broadcast a recap of the week's news stories on a Sunday night program titled Newsweek in Review, which was later moved to Saturday and retitled The Week in Review. In 1950, the nightly newscast was renamed Douglas Edwards with the News, and in September the following year it became the first news program to be broadcast simultaneously on the East Coast and West Coast through the installation of a new coaxial cable connection. That transcontinental link prompted Edwards to start each broadcast with the updated greeting "Good evening everyone, coast to coast."

On November 30, 1956, the program became the first to use the new technology of videotape to time delay the broadcast (which originated in New York City) for the western United States.

Walter Cronkite (1962–1981)

On April 16, 1962, Walter Cronkite succeeded Edwards, and the broadcast was retitled Walter Cronkite with the News. On September 2, 1963, the newscast, retitled CBS Evening News, became the first half-hour weeknight news broadcast on network television and was moved to 6:30 p.m. Eastern time (NBC's Huntley-Brinkley Report expanded to 30 minutes exactly one week later on September 9, 1963). As before, some affiliates (including flagship owned-and-operated station WCBS-TV in New York City) had the option of carrying a later edition, scheduled at 7:00 p.m. Eastern Time. NBC also allowed this practice for the Huntley-Brinkley Report, with ABC later following it for the ABC Evening News (now ABC World News Tonight). The networks ended this practice after 1971, although some affiliates – mostly in larger markets – continued to carry the national newscasts at 7:00 p.m. Eastern Time on a half-hour tape delay.

The CBS Evening News was first transmitted in color as a one-evening test broadcast on August 19, 1965, before permanently switching to the format on January 31, 1966. Cronkite's prime time special report, Who, What, When, Where, Why, broadcast on February 27, 1968, ended with his declaration that the United States could only hope for a stalemate in Vietnam. It is often credited with influencing Lyndon Johnson's decision to drop out of the race for President. "If I've lost Walter Cronkite ... [I]'ve lost Middle America", he stated.

Under Cronkite, the newscast began what would eventually become an 18-year period of dominating the ratings among the network evening news programs. In the process, Cronkite became "the most trusted man in America" according to a Gallup Poll, a status that had first been fostered in November 1963 through his coverage of the assassination of President John F. Kennedy.

In late 1972, Cronkite prodded the show's producers to feature two nights of lengthy explanation on the Watergate scandal, which had been extensively covered by The Washington Post, but had not received major national coverage. After the first half of the report, shown on a Friday, ran for 14 minutes, roughly half of the air time of the broadcast, White House officials complained to CBS founder William S. Paley. The second half of the report was aired the following Monday, but only for eight minutes.

Dan Rather (1981–2005)

1981–1993

Cronkite was replaced as anchor of the program the Monday after his retirement, March 9, 1981, by 49-year-old Dan Rather, who had been with CBS News as a correspondent since the early 1960s and later became a correspondent for the network's newsmagazine 60 Minutes. Concerns about excessive liberalism in the media were frequently leveled at Rather, the CBS Evening News, CBS News, and CBS in general. Some of these concerns dated from Rather's position as White House correspondent for the network's news division during the Nixon administration. A shouting match with Vice President George H. W. Bush during an interview on live television in January 1988 related to the Iran–Contra affair did little to dispel those concerns. Rather unapologetically defended his behavior in statements the following day, and Bush went on to win the presidential election in November.

Earlier, on September 1, 1986, amidst a brewing battle among CBS's Board of Directors for control of the company and turmoil at CBS News, Rather closed his Monday broadcast with the word "courage," repeating it the following night. On September 3, Rather said the masculine noun for the Spanish word for "courage," "coraje" (the primary translation for "courage" in Spanish is "valor"). In the face of media attention and pleas from his staff, Rather abandoned the signoff on September 8.<ref>{{cite book|title=Who Killed CBS? The Undoing of America's Number One News Network|pages=304–06|author=Peter J. Boyer|publisher=Random House|location=New York City|year=1988}}</ref>

On September 11, 1987, Rather marched off camera in anger just before a remote broadcast of the program when it appeared that CBS Sports' coverage of a U.S. Open tennis semifinal match between Steffi Graf and Lori McNeil was going to run over into time allotted for the newscast. Rather was in Miami covering the visit to the city by Pope John Paul II. When the tennis match ended sooner than expected at 6:32 p.m. Eastern Time, Rather was nowhere to be found, and six minutes of dead air followed before he returned to the broadcast position; nearly half of the audience watched and waited. Rather attempted to explain his actions with a statement release on Sunday, but made no mention of it on his next newscast on Monday, delayed by the men's final. By 1990, the CBS Evening News had fallen to third place in the ratings, behind ABC's World News Tonight with Peter Jennings and NBC Nightly News with Tom Brokaw.

On January 22, 1991, demonstrators from the AIDS Coalition to Unleash Power (ACT UP) broke into the CBS News studio and chanted "Fight AIDS, not Arabs" during the show's introduction. One protester was seen on camera just as Rather began speaking. Rather immediately called for a commercial break, however, the screen went black instead for six seconds before returning to Rather. He apologized twice to viewers about the incident.

Connie Chung as co-anchor (1993–1995)
On June 1, 1993, CBS News correspondent Connie Chung began co-anchoring the broadcast with Rather. Chung normally co-anchored in the studio with Rather, but sometimes one of them appeared on location, while the other remained in the studio. Though Rather never said so publicly, CBS News insiders said he did not approve of her appointment. Chung's last broadcast as co-anchor was on May 18, 1995.

1995–2005

The newscast returned to a solo anchor format on May 19, 1995, with Dan Rather continuing in his role as anchor. At age 73, Rather retired from the Evening News on March 9, 2005, exactly 24 years after succeeding Cronkite.

Rather left the anchor position amidst controversy and a credibility crisis over reports broadcast during the 2004 presidential election campaign. The report was a segment featured on a September 2004 broadcast of 60 Minutes Wednesday, questioning President George W. Bush's Texas Air National Guard record. Conservative activists challenged the authenticity of the documents used for the report. A number of bloggers analyzed scans of the documents, and rapidly concluded they were forgeries. Subsequently, CBS commissioned an independent inquiry into the matter and several CBS staffers were fired or asked to resign.

After departing from the Evening News, Rather remained with CBS News as a correspondent. On June 20, 2006, CBS News President Sean McManus announced that Rather and CBS had agreed to end his 44-year career with the network.

Bob Schieffer (2005–2006)

On March 10, 2005, Rather was succeeded on an interim basis by Face the Nation host and CBS News correspondent Bob Schieffer. At the time Schieffer took over, it was uncertain how long he would host the broadcast, whether it would retain its current structure, or instead adopt some kind of multiple host or alternative format. Under Rather in the years leading up to his retirement, the CBS Evening News trailed its rivals at ABC and NBC by a fairly large margin. White House correspondent John Roberts, and Scott Pelley, his predecessor in that position, were often mentioned as possible successors to Rather when he retired. Jim Axelrod became White House correspondent when Roberts later left for CNN.

In the months following Rather's departure, the program came to emphasize live exchanges between Schieffer and various CBS News correspondents around the world. In contrast to traditional network news practice, these exchanges were unrehearsed as part of an effort to make the language on the broadcast sound more "natural". Viewership increased over this period, with the program being the only network evening news broadcast to gain viewers during 2005. In November 2005, CBS announced that CBS Evening News executive producer Jim Murphy would be replaced by Rome Hartman, who took over in January 2006.

Schieffer led the CBS Evening News to become the #2 evening news broadcast, ahead of ABC's World News Tonight. The ABC News division was in flux following the death of anchor Peter Jennings in 2005, and, with the adoption of a dual-anchor format on World News Tonight, life-threatening injuries suffered by co-anchor Bob Woodruff in January 2006 when an Iraqi military convoy he rode in hit a roadside bomb, leaving Elizabeth Vargas as sole anchor. When Charles Gibson was appointed sole anchor of World News Tonight in May 2006, after Elizabeth Vargas resigned in connection with her pregnancy, ABC regained stability and momentum to regain the #2 spot.

Bob Schieffer's final CBS Evening News program was broadcast on August 31, 2006. Russ Mitchell filled in for the following two nights (September 1 and 4, 2006), after which he was succeeded by Katie Couric on September 5, 2006.

Katie Couric (2006–2011)

On December 1, 2005, it was reported that Katie Couric, co-anchor of NBC's Today, was considering an offer by CBS to anchor the Evening News. Couric officially signed a contract to become anchor of the CBS Evening News on April 1, 2006, and formally announced four days later on Today that she would be leaving the show and NBC News after a 15-year run as the morning show's co-anchor. Ratings during Couric's period as anchor fluctuated, seemingly improving at times, but also posting historic lows rivaling those dating back to at least the 1991–92 season.

Couric began working at CBS News in July 2006. During her first broadcast as anchor on September 5, 2006, a new graphics package and set, and a new theme composed by Academy Award-winning composer James Horner were introduced. Similar graphics and music would be introduced on other CBS News programs such as Up to the Minute, CBS Morning News and The Early Show throughout the month of October. A new opening title sequence was designed, with Walter Cronkite providing the voiceover, replacing Wendell Craig unless a temporary voice-over was needed. Following Cronkite's death months earlier, actor Morgan Freeman recorded a new voice-over for the title sequence, which debuted on January 4, 2010. The program also debuted a new feature called "freeSpeech" in which different Americans, ranging from well-known national figures to average people, would provide news commentary. After overwhelmingly negative reaction, the segment was discontinued.

On March 8, 2007, The New York Times reported that the program's executive producer Rome Hartman was being replaced by television news veteran Rick Kaplan. Hartman left as executive producer on March 7. Kaplan came to the Evening News after stints at MSNBC, CNN, and ABC's World News Tonight with Peter Jennings.

On April 4, 2007, Couric did a one-minute commentary about the importance of reading, in a piece substantially lifted from a Wall Street Journal column by Jeffrey Zaslow. Couric claimed that she remembered her first library card, but the words were all from Zaslow's column. It was determined that a producer had actually written the piece. What made the plagiarism especially striking was the personal flavor of the video – which was subsequently removed from the cbsnews.com website after the situation came to light that began, "I still remember when I got my first library card, browsing through the stacks for my favorite books."

Much of the rest of the script was stolen from the Journal article. Zaslow said at the time that CBS had "been very gracious and apologetic, and we at the Journal appreciate it." In a case of double plagiarism, the producer who wrote the piece copied from someone else for Couric, and the anchor claimed the words were hers when they were not. The producer responsible for Couric's piece, Melissa McNamara, was fired hours after the Journal contacted CBS News to complain. The network promised changes in its procedures.

On July 28, 2008, the CBS Evening News became the third network evening newscast to begin broadcasting in high definition (behind NBC Nightly News and PBS's The NewsHour with Jim Lehrer).

On August 27, 2008, Mediabistro wrote a piece about the Big Three network newscasts, praising Couric's Evening News for extensive reporting that had, in its opinion, content better than its rivals. Another critic from MarketWatch praised Couric's work and said that people should watch out for her in 2009. Washington Post writer Tom Shales praised Couric as a warmer, more benevolent presence than her two competitors, something that she brought to the program nearly 16 years of goodwill from doing "Today" and becoming America's sweetheart, or else very close to it, and he claimed that this goodwill remained. Shales added that viewers "may find bad news less discomforting and sleep-depriving if Couric gives it to them". He also added that she does not try to "sugarcoat" or "prettify" grim realities. According to Shales, the Evening News may be a more hospitable, welcoming sort of place than its competitors. He concluded by stating that "it's naive to think that viewers choose their news anchor based solely on strict journalistic credentials, though Couric's do seem to be in order, despite her critics' claims".

The CBS Evening News with Katie Couric won the 2008 and 2009 Edward R. Murrow Award for best newscast. In September 2008, Couric interviewed Republican vice presidential nominee Sarah Palin, earning respect from a MarketWatch critic for asking tough questions. In 2011, the program was the recipient of both an Emmy for Outstanding Continuing Coverage and the Edward R. Murrow Award for Video News Series for foreign correspondent Terry McCarthy's feature story "Afghan Bomb Squad".

On May 18, 2009, the newscast's graphics were overhauled, using a blue and red color scheme with web-influenced motifs and layouts. The new graphics design featured a look influenced by the graphics that CBS used during the 2008 presidential election coverage.

On April 3, 2011, the Associated Press reported that Couric would be leaving the Evening News when her contract expired in June. Couric later confirmed her departure to People magazine, citing a desire for "a format that will allow (her) to engage in more multi-dimensional storytelling." On May 13, 2011, Couric announced that the following Thursday, May 19, 2011, would be her last broadcast.
Despite originally retooling the newscasts to add more features, interviews, and human interest stories, over time it returned to the hard news format popularized by Cronkite. Harry Smith served as an interim anchor until Pelley's tenure started on June 6, 2011 (like Couric before him, Smith would also depart from CBS a month later).

Scott Pelley (2011–2017)

In an April 2011 article, the New York Times reported that 60 Minutes correspondent Scott Pelley was considered to be the front-runner to replace Couric as anchor of the program.

On May 3, 2011, CBS confirmed that Pelley would replace Couric as anchor for the CBS Evening News in June. The graphics were subtly updated (the Couric 2009-2011 graphics were used for the first two days of Pelley's tenure as anchor in 2011), the American flag background on the news set (which had been used since the 2008 elections, this was last used on Harry Smith interim anchor episodes until 2011) was replaced by a replica of the globe fixture during the Cronkite era, and the James Horner theme was replaced by the 1987–91 theme composed by Trivers-Myers Music that was used during the Rather era (the theme was last used on Up to the Minute on June 24, 2011, and was replaced by the Rather and Pelley theme the same year).
In his first nine months in the anchor chair, Pelley gained an additional 821,000 viewers. CBS News also enjoyed increases in its audience for special news events. After election night in 2012, Variety wrote, "With Scott Pelley front and center; the Eye was up 8% from four years ago." The CBS Evening News had increased its audience every year from 2011 through 2015. On May 29, 2015, media website The Wrap wrote: "These days, CBS brass may finally have a reason to smile. On Wednesday, the network announced 'Evening News with Scott Pelley' added more than 1.25 million viewers over the past four years – a whopping 21 percent jump. The show also saw audience growth for the fifth consecutive season, the first time any network evening news broadcast has done that since 1987."

At the end of the 2015–2016 television season, CBS News announced, "The CBS Evening News with Scott Pelley, America's fastest growing network evening news broadcast, finished the 2015–16 television season with CBS's highest ratings in the time period in 10 years (since the 2005–06 season), according to Nielsen most current ratings. The CBS Evening News has grown its audience for six consecutive seasons, a first-time achievement for any network evening news broadcast since the advent of people meters (since at least 1987). Under Pelley, who assumed the anchor chair in June 2011, the CBS Evening News has added +1.4 million viewers and an audience increase of + 23%, which is double NBC and ABC's growth combined over the same period (since the 2010–11 season).

"Pelley has refocused the program towards hard news and away from the soft news and infotainment features of the early Katie Couric era. Story selection has focused more on foreign policy, Washington politics, and economic subjects. The program's audience viewership began to grow immediately, closing the gap between the CBS Evening News and its competitors by one million viewers within a year, although the CBS program remains in third place among the network evening newscasts. In late May 2016, a new theme tune composed by Joel Beckerman of Man Made Music was introduced. Later that same year in December, the program moved permanently into CBS Studio 57, which the newscast used during their 2016 election coverage (moving from its longtime home of studio 47) at the CBS Broadcast Center and gained a new set to go with it.

On May 30, 2017, reports surfaced confirming that Scott Pelley had been relieved of his duties at CBS Evening News. Pelley remained at CBS News as a 60 Minutes correspondent. Pelley reportedly asked staff members to clear out his office. The move was made official on May 31, 2017, and Anthony Mason was named interim anchor. On June 6, 2017, CBS Evening News announced that Pelley would anchor until June 16, 2017.

Jeff Glor (2017–2019)

On October 25, 2017, CBS News announced that correspondent Jeff Glor would be the new CBS Evening News anchor. On November 26, 2017, the organization announced his first official air date for December 4, 2017. Together with Glor's debut, the newscast also updated its looks and used a new logotype and updated typography, using Ridley Grotesk as its base. However, the theme music and set from the later Pelley era were retained. On May 6, 2019, it was announced that Glor would be leaving CBS Evening News. His last day of his broadcast was May 10, 2019. John Dickerson, Major Garrett, Margaret Brennan, Anthony Mason, David Begnaud, Jim Axelrod, and Maurice DuBois anchored on an interim basis until Norah O'Donnell took the anchor chair on July 15, 2019.

Norah O'Donnell (2019–present)

On May 6, 2019, CBS News announced that Norah O'Donnell was named anchor and managing editor of CBS Evening News to replace Jeff Glor, effective July 15, 2019. It was also announced that the show would be moving to Washington, D.C. on December 2, 2019. This marks the first time that a major network evening news program is based outside of New York since 1978, when ABC World News Tonight used bureaus in Washington, Chicago and London for its broadcast. 

On April 8, 2022, it was reported that O'Donnell had renewed her contract through at least the 2024 presidential election. A rebranding of the program was unveiled on August 29, 2022, featuring a world map motif (a design that has frequently been used in CBS News programming as an homage to Walter Cronkite's era) and conformity with CBS's new unified brand elements introduced in 2020.  As part of the rebrand, the show introduced a new theme composed by Antfood, which is an arrangement of the Trivers-Myers theme used during the Dan Rather and Scott Pelley eras.

Weekend editions
The CBS Evening News expanded to weekend evenings in February 1966, originally anchored by Roger Mudd. The Sunday edition of the program was dropped in September 1971, when CBS began airing 60 Minutes in the 6:00 p.m. Eastern Time (5:00 p.m. Central) slot in order to help affiliates fulfill requirements imposed by the Federal Communications Commission (FCC)'s Prime Time Access Rule. The Sunday edition returned in January 1976, when the network moved 60 Minutes one hour later to 7:00 p.m. Eastern Time, where that program remains to this day (except when the NFL on CBS is scheduled to air a doubleheader; on those Sundays, 60 Minutes is scheduled for 7:30 p.m. ET).

From 2011 to 2014, the CBS Evening News was the only remaining network evening newscast that used separate anchors for its Saturday and Sunday editions (NBC Nightly News previously used separate anchors for both weekend broadcasts until John Seigenthaler was appointed anchor of both the Saturday and Sunday editions in 1999, while ABC's World News Tonight maintained separate anchors for its weekend editions until Saturday anchor David Muir also assumed anchor duties on the program's Sunday edition in 2011). John Roberts did anchor both Saturday and Sunday editions of the CBS Evening News for several months in 1999. More recently, Russ Mitchell served as the weekend anchor for the CBS Evening News until December 2011, when he announced his resignation from CBS News to take a lead anchor position with NBC affiliate WKYC-TV in Cleveland, Ohio. The following year, Mitchell was replaced on the weekend editions by Jim Axelrod on Saturdays and Jeff Glor on Sundays.

Weekend editions of the CBS Evening News were periodically abbreviated or preempted outright due to CBS Sports programming. On May 2, 2016, CBS announced that the weekend editions of the CBS Evening News, effective May 7, 2016, would be revamped as the CBS Weekend News, with the Saturday and Sunday editions anchored by Reena Ninan and Elaine Quijano, respectively (the Saturday edition airs only on the West Coast from September through mid December due to CBS' longstanding SEC football coverage). CBS News executive editor Steve Capus argued that "given the number of sports overruns and out-and-out pre-emptions, it would be better for us as a news organization to come up with what I think is a smarter, 24-hour approach to covering the world, and making sure we've got all the bases covered."

 Impact of COVID-19 
In March 2020, the COVID-19 pandemic caused the temporary shutdown of the CBS Broadcast Center after a number of CBS News staffers tested positive for the virus. While the network did reopen the facility for a brief period, further positive tests along with a number of corporate directives by CBS News President Susan Zirinsky resulted in a second, indefinite shutdown of the Broadcast Center. With no live weekend sporting events for the next three months (primarily due to the cancellation of CBS's March Madness coverage as well as the temporary pause of the 2019–20 PGA Tour season) resulting in no likely sports pre-emptions, production of the CBS Weekend News was dramatically altered with CBS News staffers outsourcing certain production services to select CBS-owned stations and affiliates, who would originate the newscasts from the stations' respective studios with the station or affiliate's main anchors serving as the program's anchor for the weekend. The usage of local CBS stations and affiliates was, in part, to reduce the pressure on CBS News' Washington, D.C. bureau, where the weeknight CBS Evening News is based, as it had already taken on increased responsibilities during the pandemic.

The following CBS affiliates assisted with production of the CBS Weekend News from March 14 until May 31:

 March 14–15: KCBS Los Angeles (CBS O&O)
 March 21–22 & 28-29: KTVT Fort Worth-Dallas (CBS O&O)
 April 4–5: KCNC Denver (CBS O&O)
 April 11–12: KHOU Houston
 April 18–19: WGCL Atlanta
 April 25–26: WUSA Washington, D.C.
 May 2–3: KIRO Seattle
 May 9–10: WTTV Indianapolis
 May 16–17: KOIN Portland, Oregon
 May 23–24: KOVR Sacramento (CBS O&O)
 May 30–31: KMOV St. Louis

From June 7, 2020 (a special Saturday edition of the CBS Evening News covering the weekend's George Floyd protests aired the previous day) until December 2020, with CBS Sports set to resume live coverage of the PGA Tour, CBS News resumed full production of the CBS Weekend News with either chief Washington correspondent Major Garrett or Los Angeles correspondent Jamie Yuccas presiding as anchor, as production for all CBS News programs from the CBS Broadcast Center remained temporarily suspended. On December 4, 2020, CBS News announced correspondents Adriana Diaz and Jericka Duncan would be promoted into permanent anchor positions, with Diaz leading the Saturday edition from the network's Chicago bureau at WBBM-TV and Duncan leading the Sunday edition from the CBS Broadcast Center.

Western edition
CBS introduced a Western edition of the program in 1979, which was anchored by Terry Drinkwater with staff based in its Los Angeles bureau being placed on standby for updates to the main CBS Evening News broadcast each weeknight; this lasted until September 1985, when CBS News instituted layoffs at the Los Angeles bureau following a successful fending off of a takeover attempt of the network by Ted Turner. The program eventually resumed production of the Western edition from its New York City and now Washington studios (which may also be produced from remote locations where the program is broadcast when warranted). The host will announce, "good evening to our viewers in the West" and packages may be updated to reflect late breaking news.

Anchors

Weekdays
 Richard Hubbell (1941–1942)
 Ned Calmer (1944)
 Everett Holles (1944–1945)
 Allan Jackson (1944–1945)
 Dwight Cooke (1945–1946)
 Tom O’Connor (1945–1946)
 Bob McKee (1946)
 Milo Boulton (1946)
 Jim McMullin (1946–1947)
Larry LeSueur (1947)
 Douglas Edwards (1947–1962)
 Walter Cronkite (1962–1981)
 Terry Drinkwater (Western Edition co-anchor; 1979–1985)
 Dan Rather (1981–2005)
 Connie Chung (co-anchor; 1993–1995)
 Bob Schieffer (2005–2006)
 Katie Couric (2006–2011)
 Scott Pelley (2011–2017)
 Jeff Glor (2017–2019)
 Norah O'Donnell (2019–present)

Saturdays
 Roger Mudd (1966–1973)
 Dan Rather (1973–1976)
 Bob Schieffer (1976–1996)
 Paula Zahn (1996–1999)
 John Roberts (1999)
 Thalia Assuras (1999–2008)
 Jeff Glor (2008; 2009–2010)
 Russ Mitchell (1999–2009; 2010–2011)
 Jim Axelrod (2012–2016)
 Reena Ninan (2016–2020)
 Major Garrett (2020)
  Jamie Yuccas     (2020)
 Adriana Diaz (2020–present)

Sundays
 Bob Schieffer (1976)
 Morton Dean (1976–1984)
 Susan Spencer (1985–1989)
 Connie Chung (1989–1993)
 Deborah Norville (1993–1995)
 John Roberts (1995–2006)
 Russ Mitchell (2006–2011)
 Jeff Glor (2012–2016)
 Elaine Quijano (2016–2020)
 Major Garrett (2020)
  Jamie Yuccas     (2020)
 Jericka Duncan (2020–present)

Audio format
An audio simulcast of the CBS Evening News airs weekdays on WCBS and KYW both are all-news stations formerly owned by CBS Radio. Only the first thirteen to fifteen minutes of the broadcast are aired, before resuming regular programming. In addition to a radio broadcast, the CBS Evening News is also available as a podcast.

International broadcasts
In Australia, the program is shown daily on Sky News Australia at 11:30 a.m. in New Zealand, Sky News broadcasts the program live at 1:30 a.m. local time.

From March 17, 1987, until the early 2000s, the program is shown daily (from Tuesday to Saturday) with French subtitles on French network Canal+ at 7:00 a.m. every morning.

The program was broadcast on the American Network in Mexico, Guatemala, and El Salvador.

In Japan, the CBS Evening News was shown on BS-TBS as part of that network's morning news program.

The Evening News was broadcast live on ATV World in Hong Kong daily until January 1, 2009. Belize's Tropical Vision Limited occasionally airs the program as a substitute for its airing of the NBC Nightly News'' on Saturdays and occasionally during the week.

Logos

References

External links

Internet Movie Database links:

1948 American television series debuts
1940s American television news shows
1950s American television news shows
1960s American television news shows
1970s American television news shows
1980s American television news shows
1990s American television news shows
2000s American television news shows
2010s American television news shows
2020s American television news shows
Black-and-white American television shows
CBS News
CBS original programming
English-language television shows
Flagship evening news shows
Peabody Award-winning television programs
Television series by CBS Studios
Television shows filmed in Illinois
Television shows filmed in New York City
Television shows filmed in Washington, D.C.